This is a list of films which have placed number one at the weekend box office in Venezuela during 2012.

Highest-grossing films

References

 

2012 in Venezuela
2012
Venezuela